The  is one of eight active brigades of the Japan Ground Self-Defense Force. The brigade is subordinated to the Central Army and is headquartered in Zentsūji, Kagawa. Its responsibility is the defense of Shikoku.

The brigade was formed on 27 March 2006 with units from the disbanded 2nd Combined Brigade.

Organization 
 14th Brigade, in Zentsūji
 14th Brigade HQ, in Zentsūji
 15th Rapid Deployment Regiment, in Zentsūji, with 1x headquarters, 3x Type 96 armored personnel carrier, 1x 120mm F1 mortar, and 1x Type 16 maneuver combat vehicle company
 50th Infantry Regiment, in Kōnan, with 1x headquarters, 3x infantry, and 1x 120mm mortar company
 14th Reconnaissance Company, in Zentsūji, with Type 87 armored reconnaissance vehicle
 14th Anti-Aircraft Artillery Company, in Matsuyama
 14th Combat Engineer Company, in Kōnan
 14th Signal Company, in Zentsūji
 14th Aviation Squadron, in Kōnan, flying UH-1J and OH-6D helicopters
 14th NBC-defense Company, in Zentsūji
 14th Logistic Support Battalion, in Zentsūji
 Western Army Artillery Unit, in Matsuyama, with three batteries of FH-70 155mm towed howitzers (administrative control in peacetime)

External links
 Homepage 14th Brigade (Japanese)

Japan Ground Self-Defense Force Brigade
Military units and formations established in 2006